Henry Wynn (c. 1602 – 27 July 1671) was a Welsh politician who sat in the House of Commons at various times between 1624 and 1671.

Wynn was the son of Sir John Wynn, 1st Baronet of Gwydir . He was admitted to Inner Temple in November 1618. In 1624 he was elected Member of Parliament for Merioneth and was re-elected in 1625. He was called to the bar in 1629.

In April 1640, Wynn was elected MP for Merioneth again in the Short Parliament.

In 1661, Wynn was elected MP for Merioneth in the Cavalier Parliament and sat until his death in 1671.

Wynn died at the age of 69 and is commemorated by a monument in Wynnstay Chapel, Ruabon Church.

Wynn married Jane Lloyd, daughter of Ellis Lloyd of Rhiwgogh.

References

 

1602 births
1671 deaths
Members of the Parliament of England (pre-1707) for constituencies in Wales
English MPs 1624–1625
English MPs 1625
English MPs 1640 (April)
English MPs 1661–1679
17th-century Welsh politicians